Bootleg Versions is a remix album released by R&B and Reggae Fusion group  The Fugees. The album was released on November 26, 1996. The album features only eight tracks, including seven remixes, and one new recording. The album along with their previous album, The Score, was later re-issued in 2001, as a double album, "The Complete Score" and in 2011, the two albums along with their first, Blunted on Reality was released as a 3-CD box set, "Original Album Classics". The album peaked at #127 on the Billboard 200 in the United States.

Track listing 
 "Ready or Not" (Clark Kent/Django Remix) (Hill, Jean, Michel, Lewis) - 5:17
 "Nappy Heads" (Mad Spider Mix) (Hill, Jean, Michel) - 4:27
 "Don't Cry Dry Your Eyes" (Hill, Jean, Michel) - 4:15
 "Vocab" (Salaam's Remix) (Hill, Jean, Michel) - 7:00
 "Ready or Not" (Salaam's Ready For The Show Remix) (Hill, Jean, Michel) - 4:42
 "Killing Me Softly" (Live At The Brixton Academy) (Fox, Gimbel) - 2:41
 "No Woman, No Cry" (Stephen Marley Remix) (Ford, Marley) - 5:27
 "Vocab" (Refugees Hip Hop Remix) (Hill, Jean, Michel) - 4:38

Charts

Certifications

References 

1996 remix albums
Albums produced by Salaam Remi
Albums produced by Wyclef Jean
Fugees remix albums
Columbia Records remix albums
Albums produced by Clark Kent (producer)
Ruffhouse Records remix albums